The Pease River Group is a geologic group in Texas Red Beds. It preserves fossils dating back to the Permian period.

See also

 List of fossiliferous stratigraphic units in Texas
 Paleontology in Texas

References
 

Geologic groups of Texas
Permian System of North America